Melmaruvathur Arpudhangal is 1986 Indian Tamil-language devotional film written and directed by Jagadeesan from a story by "Sakthi Dasan" C. Ganesan. Music was by K. V. Mahadevan. The film stars Rajesh, Sulakshana, Nalini and Radha Ravi. It was released on 1 October 1986.

Plot

Cast 

 Rajesh as Mari Muthu
 Sulakshana as Gayathri
 Radha Ravi as Rajadurai
 Nalini as Karpagam
 Thengai Srinivasan as Village President
 K. R. Vijaya as Goddess Sakthi
 Pile Sivan as Raja Durai's Friend
 S. N. Parvathi as Mari Muthu's Neighbour
 Payalvaan Ranganathan as Raja Durai's Henchmen
 MLA Thangaraj
 Raj Krishna
 Mythili Priya

Soundtrack 
Music was composed by K. V. Mahadevan.

Tamil version

Lyrics were written by Vaali.

Telugu version

This film was dubbed into Telugu as Aadhi Sakthi Mahimalu. Lyrics were written by Rajasri.

Reception 
The Indian Express wrote, "Jagadeesan works at his subject at an unhurried pace coolly, but not casually or perfunctorily". Jayamanmadhan of Kalki called the film's screenplay and Mahadevan's music as plus points.

References

External links 
 

1980s Tamil-language films
1986 films
Films scored by K. V. Mahadevan
Hindu devotional films
Indian films based on actual events